Srirama Chandra Bhanja Dental College and Hospital is a government dental college located in Cuttack, in the Indian state of Odisha. It is the oldest and only government dental college in Odisha. It is affiliated with the Utkal University and is recognized by Dental Council of India. It offers Bachelor of Dental Science (BDS) and Master of Dental Science (MDS) courses.

References

External links
 scbmchalumni.in

Dental colleges in India
Colleges affiliated to Utkal University
Universities and colleges in Odisha
1944 establishments in India
Educational institutions established in 1944